Anthony Leonard Penberthy (born 1 September 1969) is a former cricketer who spent his entire career at Northamptonshire County Cricket Club. He joined the club in 1989. In 1992 he helped Northamptonshire to win the NatWest Trophy. He received his county cap in 1994 and was released in 2003. Penberthy continued Minor County cricket for Norfolk and Cornwall until 2006.

References

Living people
English cricketers
Northamptonshire cricketers
1969 births
Sportspeople from Cornwall
Cornwall cricketers
Norfolk cricketers